PEI or Pei may refer to:

Places 
Matecaña International Airport, Pereira, Colombia, IATA code PEI
Pei County (沛县), Jiangsu, China
Pei Commandery (沛郡), a commandery in Chinese history
Prince Edward Island, a province of Canada
Pei, Tibet, a town in Tibet

People 
Bei (surname) (貝), romanized Pei in Wade–Giles
Pei (surname), a Chinese surname (裴) or an Italian surname
I. M. Pei (1917–2019), a Chinese-American architect
Mario Pei (1901–1978), an Italian-American linguist

Polymers 
Polyetherimide (PEI), a thermoplastic similar to PEEK
Polyethylenimine (PEI), a type of water-soluble polymer

Other uses 
 Paul Ehrlich Institute, Germany
 Pei language
 Pe (Semitic letter) (פ), or pei, a letter in the Hebrew alphabet
 Petroleum & Energy Infrastructures Ltd. (PEI), Israel
 Princeton Environmental Institute of Princeton University
 Private Equity International, a financial magazine
 Private Education Institution (Singapore)
 Shar Pei, a wrinkled dog breed
 Pie
 Pee (disambiguation)